("In April"), WAB 75 is a lied composed by Anton Bruckner in .

History 
Bruckner composed the lied on a text of Emanuel Geibel during his stay in Linz. He dedicated the lied to his pupil Helene Hofmann, Pauline Hofmann's younger sister.

The date of composition is uncertain. It was originally supposed that the lied was composed in 1868. Because it was dedicated to "Helene Hofmann", Angela Pachovsky put the date "before 18 September 1865" instead, i.e., before Helene's wedding with Heinrich Heissler.

The manuscript is lost, but a copy is stored in the archive of the St. Florian Abbey. In 1898 the work was issued by Bernhard Herzmansky by Doblinger. The first performance occurred on 5 February 1903 by Gisela Seehofer in a concert of the Wiener Akademischer Wagner-Verein, during which Seehofer sung also Bruckner's Ave Maria, WAB 7 and Wie bist du, Frühling, gut und treu.

Text 

The song uses a text by Emanuel Geibel.

Music 
The 60-bar long work in A major is scored for solo voice and piano.

Discography 
There are three recordings of Im April:
 Robert Holzer (bass), Thomas Kerbl (piano), Anton Bruckner Lieder/Magnificat – CD: LIVA 046, 2011. NB: Transposed in G major.
 Ulf Bästlein (baritone), Sascha El Mouissi (piano), Ich blick’ in mein Herz und ich blick' in die Welt - CD Gramola 99136, 2017
 Elisabeth Wimmer (soprano), Daniel Linton-France (piano) in: Bruckner, Anton – Böck liest Bruckner II – CD Gramola 99237, 2020

References

Sources 
 Anton Bruckner – Sämtliche Werke, Band XXIII/1: Songs for voice and piano (1851–1882), Musikwissenschaftlicher Verlag der Internationalen Bruckner-Gesellschaft, Angela Pachovsky (Editor), Vienna, 1997
 Cornelis van Zwol, Anton Bruckner 1824–1896 – Leven en werken, uitg. Thoth, Bussum, Netherlands, 2012. 
 Uwe Harten, Anton Bruckner. Ein Handbuch. , Salzburg, 1996. .
 Crawford Howie, Anton Bruckner - A documentary biography, online revised edition

External links 
 
 Im April As-Dur, WAB 75 – Critical discography by Hans Roelofs 
 A translation of Geibel's text is also available on The LiederNet Archive: "You damp spring evening".
 Robert Holzer's performance can also be heard on YouTube: A. Bruckner - Im April

Lieder by Anton Bruckner
1865 compositions
Compositions in A-flat major